Soufiane Messeguem (born 5 February 2001) is a German professional footballer who plays as a midfielder for Portuguese club Académico de Viseu.

Club career
FC Magdeburg and VfL Wolfsburg. Messeguem made his senior debut for VfL Wolfsburg II on 18 September 2020 in a 3–2 win over HSC Hannover in the Regionalliga Nord. In summer 2021, Messeguem signed for 2. Bundesliga side Erzgebirge Aue on a three-year contract, he made his debut as a substitute in a 0–0 draw with 1. FC Nürnberg on 25 July 2021.

On 22 July 2022, Messeguem signed a four-year contract with Académico de Viseu in Portugal.

International career
Messeguem has represesented Germany at under-18, under-19 and under-20 levels.

References

External links

1999 births
German people of Algerian descent
People from Coburg
Sportspeople from Upper Franconia
Footballers from Bavaria
Living people
German footballers
Germany youth international footballers
Association football midfielders
1. FC Magdeburg players
VfL Wolfsburg II players
FC Erzgebirge Aue players
Académico de Viseu F.C. players
2. Bundesliga players
Regionalliga players
Liga Portugal 2 players
German expatriate footballers
Expatriate footballers in Portugal
German expatriate sportspeople in Portugal